Saint Agnes is a painting currently exhibited at the National Art Museum of Catalonia.

Description 
A three-quarter length depiction of Agnes of Rome shows the saint in direct communication with God.  Her head is slightly raised, her mouth half open, and the fingers of her hand are spread open over her heart while with her other hand she caresses the Mystic Lamb.  Her neckline shifts sideways to reveal part of her shoulder, the highest degree of eroticism in the work of Stanzione.

History 
The work was attributed to Massimo Stanzione ( Frattamaggiore 1585 - Naples 1656) in 1954 by José Milicua, who viewed it in the collection of Tomás Harris at that time.  The work made its way to the collection of Santiago Espona who bequested it to the Museu Nacional d'Art de Catalunya in November 1958.

Exposition catalogue listings

1958 Barcelona p.11  Cat #78
1963 Barcelona P.16
1987 Girona    p.48  Cat #46
1989 Barcelona p.49  Cat #46
1998 Palma     p.114 Cat #32

Analysis 

In attributing this painting to Stanzione, José Milicua offers comparisons between this painting and another portrayal of the same saint by Stanzione which belonged to the Laliccia Collection in Naples which makes use of the same model and is differentiated only by a slight turn of the model's head.  In both paintings, Stanzione has dispensed with the halo and palm leaf, omissions that are common in Neapolitan painting of the 1600s.  Although lacking the traditional external signs of sainthood, her status as one of God's elect is evidenced in the raised head and upturned eyes, an open mouth, and the hand with fingers spread over the heart.  The block of stone closing off a corner of the composition is a device commonly used in Neapolitan painting of this century.  However, in the case of Saint Agnes, the stone block also serves to represent the altar on which the Agnus Dei, or sacrificial lamb is placed.

Stuck to the back of the canvas are some lines of poetry in English in praise of Saint Agnes, cut from printed matter which looks like it might be from the nineteenth century or earlier.

References

Further reading 
 L´esplendor de la pintura del barroc: mecenatge català al Museu Nacional d'Art de Catalunya: Museu Nacional d'Art de Cataluyna, maig de 1996 / Maria Margarita Cuyàs. Barcelona: Museu Nacional d'Art de Cataluyna, 1996 p. 96-97 (English translation, pages 180-186)
 Massimo Stanzione: L´Opera completa, Nàpolis by S. Schütze, 1992 p. 208

External links 
 Museu Nacional d'Art de Catalunya - Saint Agnes
 Google Art Project - Saint Agnes 1635-1640

Paintings in the collection of the Museu Nacional d'Art de Catalunya
Stanzione
1630s paintings
Stanzione
Sheep in art